The Fengman Dam is a concrete gravity dam  from Jilin City on the Second Songhua River in Jilin Province, China. The main purposes of the dam are hydroelectric power generation and flood control. Construction of the dam began in 1937 and was complete in 1953. The dam is owned and operated by Northeast China Grid Company Limited. 

A new dam was completed in 2019, and the old dam will be dismantled, except for a small section preserved for historical interest .

History
Construction on the Fengman Dam began in 1937 under the Japanese during their occupation of parts of China during World War II. In November 1942, the reservoir behind the dam began to fill and by March 1943, the first generators were operational. Still lacking floodgates, the dam was not entirely complete after the Japanese occupation in 1953. In 1959, the eighth and final generator of the first stage was installed, bringing the power station's installed capacity to 552.5 MW. Between 1970 and 1979, a tunnel was installed on the left bank of the dam and it was later converted into a flood discharge tunnel in 1991. In 1988, the second stage of construction began which included the installation of a ninth and tenth turbine. This was complete in 1992 and the plant's total installed capacity was 722.5 MW. From 1993 to 1998, the third stage of constructed on the dam was carried out, bringing the power station to a final installed capacity of 1002.5 MW.

Reservoir

Annual rainfall in the reservoir zone is  -  with 60-90 percent falling between July and September each year.

Design
Sections 1-8, 20 and 32-60 are non-overflow while 9-19 contain the 11 crest overflow spillways. Sections 21-31 contain the ten intakes and penstocks for the power plant which rest at their base, the dam's toe.

New Dam
A new dam was constructed 120m downstream of the old dam, during the period 2015-2019 

The new dam is 50% higher than the old one, and has 50% more electrical generation capacity. As the last of the new turbines was installed in 2019, work started on dismantling the old dam.

See also 

 List of power stations in China

References

Dams on the Second Songhua River
Dams in China
Gravity dams
Hydroelectric power stations in Jilin
Jilin City
Dams completed in 1953